DWJJ (684 AM) is a radio station owned and operated by Kaissar Broadcasting Network The station's studio and transmitter are located at Celcor Compound, Bitas, Cabanatuan.

References

News and talk radio stations in the Philippines
Radio stations established in 1999
Radio stations in Nueva Ecija